Not Long for this World is a collection of fantasy and horror short stories by American writer August Derleth. It was released in 1948 and was the author's third collection published by Arkham House.  It was released in an edition of 2,067 copies.

Most of the stories had originally appeared in the magazine Weird Tales.

Contents

Not Long for this World contains the following tales:

 "Foreword"
 "The Shadow on the Sky"
 "Birkett's Twelfth Corpse"
 "The White Moth"
 "Nellie Foster"
 "Wild Grapes"
 "Feigman's Beard"
 "The Drifting Snow"
 "The Return of Sarah Purcell"
 "Logoda's Heads"
 "The Second Print"
 "Mrs. Elting Does Her Part"
 "A Little Knowledge"
 "Mrs. Bentley's Daughter"
 "Those Who Seek"
 "Mr. Berbeck Had a Dream"
 "The Tenant"
 "The Lilac Bush"
 "'Just a Song at Twilight'"
 "A Matter of Sight"
 "Prince Borgia's Mass"
 "A Dinner at Imola"
 "Lesandro's Familiar"
 "The Bridge of Sighs"
 "A Cloak from Messr. Lando"
 "He Shall Come"
 "Mrs. Lannisfree"
 "After You, Mr. Henderson"
 "Baynter's Imp"
 "The Lost Day"
 "A Collector of Stones"
 "The God-Box"
 "Saunder's Little Friend"

Sources

1948 short story collections
Fantasy short story collections
Horror short story collections
Arkham House books